The minister of Digital Government was a minister of the Crown in the Canadian Cabinet with responsibility for Shared Services Canada (SSC)—the federal department that manages and maintains information technology services throughout the Government of Canada, as well as the digital strategies and programs of the Treasury Board of Canada Secretariat. (The first two ministers of Digital Government were also concurrently the president of the Treasury Board.)

This position was introduced in the 29th Canadian Ministry under the premiership of Justin Trudeau. Prior to 2018, responsibility for oversight of SSC was in the portfolio of the minister of Public Services and Procurement. In 2021, the position was abolished and responsibility for SSC was returned to the Minister of Public Services and Procurement.

List of ministers

Key:

References 

Digital Government